The Thomasville Railroad Passenger Depot is a historic train station located at Thomasville, Davidson County, North Carolina. It is one of the oldest remaining frame depots in the state, built between 1870 and 1871. The board-and-batten building features Victorian sawnwork detailing. Until 1912, it served as a passenger train station with the Richmond and Danville Railroad and later the Southern Railway. Due to the increase in passenger rail travel, a new brick depot was built. This depot was then moved to the north side of the tracks and served as a freight agent's office. The Southern Railway eventually gave the structure to the town. The Thomasville Historical Society raised $5,000 for its restoration in 1969. Another restoration was completed in the late 1990s. In July 2000, the Thomasville Railroad Passenger Depot became the home of the Thomasville Visitors' Center.

It was added to the National Register of Historic Places in 1981.

References

Railway stations on the National Register of Historic Places in North Carolina
Victorian architecture in North Carolina
Museums in Davidson County, North Carolina
Transportation in Davidson County, North Carolina
Stations along Southern Railway lines in the United States
Railway stations in the United States opened in 1871
National Register of Historic Places in Davidson County, North Carolina
Thomasville, North Carolina
Former railway stations in North Carolina